Valgejõgi (lit. White River) is a river in Northern Estonia. Its source is in Lake Porkuni in Pandivere (Lääne-Viru County) and it drains into Hara Bay (part of Finnish Gulf) at Loksa (Harju County).

Geography
Valgejõgi lacks any major tributaries. Its drainage basin is long and narrow, dominated by forests and wetlands (more than 2/3 of total area). Agricultural land use is concentrated in the upper section of drainage basin, while forests dominate in the middle and lower sections, where the river borders the Põhja-Kõrvemaa Nature Reserve and flows through Lahemaa National Park. The towns of Loksa (in the mouth) and Tapa (about 17 km from the source) are the only bigger settlements  on the river.

Nõmmeveski waterfall
19 km upstream from the river mouth the river flows over the Baltic Klint, forming the Nõmmeveski waterfall. The waterfall and Nõmmeveski canyon (several tens of meters deep and a few hundred meters long) are a popular tourist destination in Lahemaa National Park.

References

Rivers of Estonia
Landforms of Harju County
Landforms of Lääne-Viru County